Indy 4 is an arcade driving game by Atari, originally released in 1976.  It is a 4-player game that was preceded by its larger 8-player counterpart, Indy 800, in 1975.

Technology
The game is housed in a large custom square cabinet with two steering wheels and four pedals on each side.  The monitor sits in the top of the cabinet.  The game uses a full-color RGB display and does not use color overlays.

The cabinet also features overhead mirrors to allow spectators to watch the game while it's being played.

Gameplay
Gameplay is a simulation of an Indianapolis 500 style of race, in which players compete by racing each other with simulated IndyCar race cars.  The player cars' colors are light blue, green, red, and dark blue.

References

1976 video games
Arcade video games
Atari arcade games
Discrete video arcade games
Top-down racing video games
Video games developed in the United States
Indianapolis 500